Pamela Petro is an author, artist, and educator. Her books, including Travels in an Old Tongue (1996), Sitting up with the Dead (2001, UK, 2002, 2017 US), The Slow Breath of Stone (2005), and The Long Field (2021, UK 2023, US) investigate ideas of place, home, longing, and belonging, using people and places to illuminate and reveal one another. She is interested in the Welsh concept of hiraeth, an intractable longing for someone or something — a home, a culture, a language, or younger self — that’s been left behind or taken away, or has only ever existed in the imagination. Petro’s photography-based visual art explores similar themes in both environmental and word-image installations. 

Petro teaches creative nonfiction and graphic novel and comics on Lesley University's MFA in Creative Writing Program and at Smith College, and is co-Director of the Dylan Thomas Summer School in Creative Writing at the University of Wales Trinity Saint David.

The Long Field (2021, UK) published by Little Toller, was shortlisted for the Wales Book of the Year 2022.

Career

Petro received her BA from Brown University and MA in Word and Image Studies from St David's University College, now the University of Wales Trinity Saint David.

In 2019 Petro exhibited The Blink of Our Lifetimes: The Ecology of Dusk at the Watson Institute for International and Public Affairs at Brown University.

Co-Writer in Residence with Marguerite Harrison, Spring Creek Project for Ideas, Nature and the Written Word, Oregon State University: Collaborative Residency at the Cabin at Shotpouch Creek, August 2015.

MacDowell Colony Fellow, Fall, 2014; selected as Robert and Stephanie Olmsted Fellow for 2013-14.

Honorary Fellow, University of Wales, Trinity St David, 2014.

In 2011 she was named by the National Park Service as an Artist in Residence at the Grand Canyon, for both writing and photography.

Awards and Shortlists 
The Long Field (2021, UK), published by Little Toller, was shortlisted for the Wales Book of the Year 2022.

Financial Times Best Travel Books 2021

A Notable Essay of 2015 in the Best American Essay Series for Flow, (Graphic Essay), Slab Issue No. 9, Spring, 2014.

Books 
 The Long Field, 2021 and 2023, UK, Little Toller; 2023, US, Arcade Publishing.
 The Slow Breath of Stone: A Romanesque Love Story, 2005, Fourth Estate
 Sitting Up With The Dead: A Storied Journey Through the American South, 2001, UK, Flamingo;  2002 US and 2nd edition 2017, Arcade Publishing; 2013, Audible edition.
 Travels in an Old Tongue: Touring the World in Welsh, 1997, Flamingo, HarperCollins.

Essays (Selected) 
"Queen of the stone age: my love affair with Wales’ megaliths." The Guardian, October 3, 2021.

"Cooking Backwards. On becoming a kitchen archivist." Guernica Magazine, May 24, 2021.

"The AElfgyva Syndrome and Erasure of Women’s Stories." Ms. Magazine, January 3, 2021.

"Shedding Light. Darkness obscures and sunlight reveals, but dusk—that liminal moment in between—murmurs suggestions." (Graphic Essay), Guernica Magazine, November 2, 2020.

"Coincidence." The Harvard Review, December 22, 2017.

"Erosion" (Graphic Essay), Lumina Online Issue No. 3, March 2015.

"Dreaming in Welsh" The Paris Review Daily, 18 Sept. 2012.

Comics 
Strange Bedfellows, a recurring Backpage Comic in The American Scholar, beginning March 2021.

Interviews (Selected) 
Season Salon with Mike Parker

Nostalgia Podcast with Chris Deacy

Nantucket Athenaeum with Jane Brox

A.J. West’s Instagram Podcast

Mike’s Season Salon on The Clearing

Noel James Radio Cymru programme

Lesley podcast with Georgia Sparling

CBC Tapestry interview, posted 27 Feb, 2022

Cambridge Common Writers, 7 April 2022

The Telegraph Best Travel Books of 2021

BBC Online Magazine, Cymru Fyw

Wales Arts Review, 14 Sept 2021, Printed excerpt from The Long Field

Jon Gower Review, Nation Cymru

Stanford’s Travel Bookstore newsletter blog

The Guardian on Pentre Ifan

Caught by the River

Lit Wales what’s happening

The Three Hares Blog (Lisa Tulfer)

Financial Times Best Travel Books 2021

Guardian 10 Walks in Winter

New Welsh Review

Lampeter 200th celebration

References

External links

 
 Queen of the stone age: my love affair with Wales’ megaliths. The Guardian, October 3, 2021.
 Cooking Backwards. On becoming a kitchen archivist, Guernica Magazine, May 24, 2021.
 The AElfgyva Syndrome and Erasure of Women’s Stories. Ms. Magazine, January 3, 2021.
 Shedding Light. Darkness obscures and sunlight reveals, but dusk—that liminal moment in between—murmurs suggestions, (Graphic Essay),  Guernica Magazine, November 2, 2020.
 Coincidence, The Harvard Review, December 22, 2017.
 Erosion, (Graphic Essay), Lumina Online Issue No. 3, March 2015.
 Dreaming in Welsh, The Paris Review Daily, 18 Sept. 2012.

Year of birth missing (living people)
Living people
21st-century American women artists
21st-century American women writers
Brown University alumni
Smith College faculty
Alumni of the University of Wales
American women academics